Dr. Carl Frederick Prutton (July 30, 1898 – July 15, 1970)  was an American chemist, chemical engineer, inventor, industrial executive, philanthropist and educator.

Prutton held more than a hundred patents on lubricants and chemical processes known  in the chemical industry as "the Prutton patents".

Prutton was the head of the department of chemistry and chemical engineering at the Case Institute of Technology,
a director of research and a vice president at Olin Mathieson Chemical Corporation,
an executive vice president of the Food Machinery and Chemical Corporation,
and a member of the National Academy of Engineering.
He received several notable awards and distinctions including the Perkin Medal of the Society of Chemical Industry,
the Modern Pioneer Award of the National Association of Manufacturers,
an honorary Doctor of Science degree from Manhattan College.

Chronology 
 1898: born in Cleveland, Ohio on July 30
 1920: B.S., Chemical Engineering, Case Institute of Technology
 1923: M.S., Case Institute of Technology
 1928: Ph.D., physical chemistry, Western Reserve University
 1929: associate professor in 1929, Case Institute of Technology
 1936-1948: full professor and chairman of the Department of Chemistry and Chemical Engineering, Case Institute of Technology
 1948: director of research, Olin Mathieson Chemical Corporation, Baltimore
 1949: vice-president, Olin Mathieson Chemical Corporation
 1952: president of a division, Olin Mathieson Chemical Corporation
 1954: vice president and director of the chemical division, the Food Machinery and Chemical Corporation
 1956: executive vice president, the Food Machinery and Chemical Corporation

References 

1898 births
1970 deaths
20th-century American chemists
Case Western Reserve University alumni
Members of the United States National Academy of Engineering
Scientists from Cleveland
Engineers from Ohio
20th-century American engineers
20th-century American inventors